The 2019 FIM CEV Moto3 Junior World Championship was the eighth CEV Moto3 season and the sixth under the FIM.

Calendar
The following races took place in 2019.

Entry list

Championship standings

Scoring system
Points are awarded to the top fifteen finishers. A rider has to finish the race to earn points.

Riders' championship

Constructors' championship

References

External links 

FIM CEV Moto3 Junior World Championship
Moto3 Junior World Championship